Time Will Tell is an early American game show that aired on the DuMont Television Network Fridays at 10:30 pm ET from August 27 to October 15, 1954. The host was Ernie Kovacs. Don Russell was the announcer, and Eddie Hatrak provided music.

Game play involved three contestants answering questions in 90-second rounds, timed with a large hourglass.

The sustaining program, produced and distributed by the network, aired on most DuMont affiliates on Fridays at 10:30 pm Eastern Time, replacing Gamble on Love which was also hosted by Kovacs in the same time slot. After Time Will Tell ended, DuMont replaced the series with local (non-network) programming.

Episode status
DuMont, like NBC and CBS during the 1950s, probably kept at least one or two "example" episodes of each of its main game shows, though DuMont's exact policy is not known. However, DuMont's archive was destroyed after the network ceased broadcasting in 1956. Although a small number of DuMont game show episodes are known to exist in various archives, none are known to exist of either Time will Tell nor Gamble on Love.

See also
 List of programs broadcast by the DuMont Television Network
 List of surviving DuMont Television Network broadcasts
 1954-55 United States network television schedule

References

Bibliography
David Weinstein, The Forgotten Network: DuMont and the Birth of American Television (Philadelphia: Temple University Press, 2004) 
Tim Brooks and Earle Marsh, The Complete Directory to Prime Time Network TV Shows, Third edition (New York: Ballantine Books, 1964) 
 David Schwartz, Steve Ryan and Fred Wostbrock (1995) The Encyclopedia of American Game Shows, Second edition (New York: Facts on File Inc., 1995)

External links
 
 DuMont historical website

1950s American game shows
Black-and-white American television shows
English-language television shows
DuMont Television Network original programming
1954 American television series debuts
1954 American television series endings
Lost television shows
Television game shows with incorrect disambiguation